Platelet-activating factor acetylhydrolase IB subunit gamma is an enzyme that in humans is encoded by the PAFAH1B3 gene.

Interactions 

PAFAH1B3 has been shown to interact with PAFAH1B1 and LNX1.

See also 
 PAFAH1B1
 PAFAH1B2

References

Further reading